Igor Borisovich Lebedev (born 18 October 1978) is a Russian professional football coach and a former player. He is an assistant coach with FC Zvezda Saint Petersburg.

Club career
He played two seasons in the Russian Football National League for FC Lokomotiv St. Petersburg.

References

External links
 

1978 births
Footballers from Saint Petersburg
Living people
Russian footballers
Association football midfielders
FC Sibir Novosibirsk players
FC Lokomotiv Saint Petersburg players